Kress is an unincorporated community located in Brunswick County, in the U.S. state of Virginia.

References

Unincorporated communities in Virginia
Unincorporated communities in Brunswick County, Virginia